VI SS Army Corps (Latvian) or VI. SS-Freiwilligen-Armeekorps (Lettisches)  (German) was a corps of the Waffen-SS during World War II. It was formed in October 1943 to command the Latvian Waffen-SS divisions. It fought in the northern sector of the Eastern Front as part of the 18th Army. They were part of Army Group North until early 1945, when it was subordinated to Army Group Courland. In October 1944, they were encircled by the Red Army and spent the remainder of the war in the Courland Pocket, until they surrendered to the Red Army at end of the war.

Commanders
Obergruppenführer Karl Pfeffer-Wildenbruch (8 Oct 1943 – 11 June 1944) 
Obergruppenführer Friedrich Jeckeln (11 June 1944 – 21 July 1944) 
Gruppenführer Karl Fischer von Treuenfeld (21 July 1944 – 25 July 1944) 
Obergruppenführer Walther Krüger (25 July 1944 – 8 May 1945)

Area of operations
Eastern Front, Northern Sector (October 1943 – September 1944)
Latvia (September 1944 – May 1945)

Order of battle
 Corps staff
 106th SS Signals Battalion
 506th SS Nebelwerfer Battalion
 506th Heavy SS Artillery Ranging Battery
 106/506th SS Flak Battalion
 VI SS Corps Pioneer Company
 VI SS Corps Lehr Battalion
 106th SS Transport Company
 106th SS Feldgendarmerie Company
  15th Waffen Grenadier Division of the SS (1st Latvian) 
  19th Waffen Grenadier Division of the SS (2nd Latvian)

References

Caballero Carlos, Germany's Eastern Front Allies (2), Osprey Publishing, 2002, 

Waffen-SS corps
Military units and formations established in 1943
Military units and formations disestablished in 1945